The 1961 winners of the Torneo di Viareggio (in English, the Viareggio Tournament, officially the Viareggio Cup World Football Tournament Coppa Carnevale), the annual youth football tournament held in Viareggio, Tuscany, are listed below.

Format
The 16 teams are organized in knockout rounds. The round of 16 are played in two-legs, while the rest of the rounds are single tie.

Participating teams

Italian teams

  Bologna
  Fiorentina
  Inter Milan
  Juventus
  L.R. Vicenza
  Milan
  Sampdoria
  Torino
  Udinese

European teams

  Partizan Beograd
  Rijeka
  Dinamo Zagreb
  Dukla Praha
  Saloniki
  Wiener SK
  Bayern München

Tournament fixtures

Champions

Footnotes

External links
 Official Site (Italian)
 Results on RSSSF.com

1961
1960–61 in Italian football
1960–61 in Yugoslav football
1960–61 in German football
1960–61 in Austrian football
1960–61 in Czechoslovak football
1960–61 in Greek football